Friedrich Wilhelm Schultz (3 January 1804 – 30 December 1876) was a German pharmacist and botanist who was a native of Zweibrücken.

He initially learned the pharmacy profession at his father's store in Zweibrücken. In 1827 be began studies in Munich, later performing post-doctoral work in Tübingen. In 1832 he became owner of a pharmacy in Bitsch, and in 1853 relocated to Weissenburg.

Schultz was a specialist regarding the botanical family Orobanchaceae. One of his better known publications was a book on Palatinate flora called Flora der Pfalz. With Paul Constant Billot (1796-1863), he was co-author of Archives de la flore de France et d’Allemagne.

In 1840 with his brother, Carl Heinrich Schultz (1805-1867), et al., he founded the scientific society POLLICHIA, a group specializing in nature studies of the Rheinland-Pfalz region.

References
 Parts of this article are based on a translation of an article from the German Wikipedia, namely: Allgemeine Deutsche Biographie, ADB: Schultz, Friedrich Wilhelm.
 Index des botanistes- Fleurs sauvages de l'Yonne

German pharmacists
1804 births
1876 deaths
People from the Palatinate (region)
People from Zweibrücken
19th-century German botanists